WBKI (channel 58) is a television station licensed to Salem, Indiana, United States, serving the Louisville, Kentucky area as an affiliate of The CW and MyNetworkTV. It is the only full-power Louisville-area station licensed to the Indiana side of the market. WBKI is owned by Block Communications alongside Fox affiliate WDRB (channel 41). Both stations share studios on West Muhammad Ali Boulevard (near US 150) in downtown Louisville, while WBKI's transmitter is located in rural northeastern Floyd County, Indiana (northeast of Floyds Knobs). Despite Salem being WBKI's city of license, the station maintains no physical presence there.

Block formerly operated a CW affiliate with the WBKI-TV call sign on channel 34, licensed to Campbellsville, Kentucky, under a local marketing agreement (LMA) with owner LM Communications, LLC. Following the sale of channel 34's spectrum in the Federal Communications Commission (FCC)'s incentive auction, the Campbellsville station ceased broadcasting on October 25, 2017 (with its license canceled on October 31); its channels are now broadcast solely through channel 58 on that station's license.

History
The station first signed on the air on March 16, 1994, as WFTE, with the call letters being an abbreviation of its channel number. Branded on-air as "Big 58," it originally operated as an independent station. It was originally licensed to Salem, Indiana businessman Don Martin, Jr. Martin sold the license in 1993 to another Salem businessman, Tom Ledford, who worked with WDRB to program the station under one of the earliest local marketing agreements in existence. WFTE also aired the police procedural series NYPD Blue during the 1994–95 season as ABC affiliate WHAS-TV (channel 11) declined to carry the program, as many ABC affiliates in the Southern United States did when it premiered, but would later cede to viewer and advertiser pressure to carry it when the show gained traction in the national ratings.

The station became a charter affiliate of the United Paramount Network (UPN), when the network launched on January 16, 1995. Block Communications purchased the station outright in 2001, creating the first television duopoly in the Louisville market; that year, the station was rebranded as "Great 58," becoming one of the few full-time UPN affiliates not to incorporate any network branding during its tenure with the network.

On January 24, 2006, CBS Corporation and the Warner Bros. unit of Time Warner announced that the two companies would shut down UPN and The WB, and combine the networks' respective programming to create a new "fifth" network called The CW. On March 1, 2006, WB affiliate WBKI-TV (channel 34) signed an agreement to become Louisville's CW affiliate, becoming among the first stations outside the charter Tribune Broadcasting and CBS Television Stations groups to sign affiliation deals with the network.

On February 22, 2006, News Corporation announced the launch of MyNetworkTV, a new "sixth" network that would be operated by Fox Television Stations and its syndication division 20th Television. MyNetworkTV was created to compete against another upstart network that would launch at the same time that September, The CW (an amalgamated network that originally consisted primarily of UPN and The WB's higher-rated programs) as well as to give UPN and WB stations that were not mentioned as becoming CW affiliates another option besides converting to independent stations. Fifteen days after WBKI's affiliation deal with The CW was announced, on March 15, 2006, WFTE signed a deal to affiliate with MyNetworkTV. Block Communications filed an application with the Federal Communications Commission to change the station's call letters to WMYO (to reflect its new network affiliation, standing for "MyNetworkTV Ohio Valley") on July 7, 2006; the station joined the network when it launched on September 5, 2006.

In early 2011, the master control operations for WDRB and WMYO were upgraded to allow the transmission of syndicated and locally produced programs in high definition; it also upgraded its severe weather ticker seen on both stations to be overlaid on HD programming without having to downconvert the content to standard definition.

On June 1, 2012, WMYO, WDRB and their respective subchannels were pulled from the market's major cable provider Insight Communications, as Block was unable to come to terms on a new retransmission consent agreement with Time Warner Cable (which purchased Insight in February 2012 and officially took over and rebranded the company under the Time Warner Cable name in 2013). Great American Country temporarily replaced WMYO on its designated slots on channel 10 and digital channel 999. The affected stations were restored on June 6, 2012, as a result of a new carriage agreement between Block and TWC. According to the contract terms, WMYO is offered at no cost, with all fees going towards carriage of WDRB and affiliation dues that Block paid to Fox and MyNetworkTV.

On February 12, 2018, the station took the WBKI-TV callsign formerly associated with the Campbellsville-licensed CW affiliate which existed from 1983 to 2017 on channel 34 and had their programming merged onto after WBKI's sale of spectrum in October 2017; its channels were numbered 34 in the interim period. The same day, Block downgraded the former WMYO schedule onto its DT3 subchannel, making The CW schedule the primary affiliation and ended their use of the defunct channel 34 allocation. This solved an issue where DirecTV and Dish refused to carry the new form of WBKI and its CW schedule as a subchannel, though WMYO's carriage for the MyNetworkTV subchannel on those providers was sacrificed as a result (but retained as-is on area cable providers). Block coordinated with New Albany Broadcasting, the owners of WKYI-CD (channel 24) to finesse the callsign change; WKYI took the calls WBKI-CD temporarily in November 2017 (with the WKYI calls moving to New Albany's radio station on 1600 AM until being abandoned in August 2022), then exchanged those calls for the calls of WMYO on February 12, thus channel 24 now holds the call letters WMYO-CD, preventing any re-use (or at least allowing New Albany and Block to sell them at a premium to another out-of-market station). The "-TV" suffix was dropped on February 19.

Programming
Current syndicated programs on WBKI's main channel include The People's Court, The Real, Family Feud, Last Man Standing and The Goldbergs. The MyNetworkTV subchannel airs Jerry Springer, Steve Wilkos, Judge Mathis, Page Six TV, Daily Mail TV and Right This Minute. Both channels also feature second runs of WDRB's syndicated programming, including Judge Judy and Dr. Oz.

Alternately, WBKI-DT3 is utilized as an 'overflow' station for WDRB's newscasts (especially the 10:00 p.m. newscast) when Fox Sports programming overlays the timeslot. Both WBKI-DT1 and WBKI-DT3 carry an alert map display denoted with WDRB's news logo on the bottom of the screen during severe weather situations affecting the Kentuckiana region, and may break into both stations' programming in rare weather or news situations.

Sports programming
WMYO formerly carried Indiana Hoosiers and Big Ten Conference football and basketball games; this ended when the conference moved all of its non-network games to the cable- and satellite-exclusive Big Ten Network when it launched in 2007. WMYO also carried some Notre Dame Fighting Irish football games televised by NBC in lieu of WAVE (channel 3), during situations in which the games conflicted with the station's telecasts of Southeastern Conference college football games (which were syndicated by corporate parent Raycom Media's sports division Raycom Sports) until Raycom's contract with the SEC ended in 2009. It also broadcast Indianapolis Colts preseason games, home and away. In 2017, WMYO carried eight Louisville City FC soccer matches as part of their three-station broadcast deal with WDRB and WBNA.

Technical information

Subchannels
The station's digital signal is multiplexed:

The station launched its second digital subchannel in early 2011, which initially carried only a test pattern (with a coded text station ID reading "WMYO58-2SALM") until December 1, 2011; on that date, the subchannel became a charter affiliate of My Family TV (which was of no relation to MyNetworkTV, despite the similar naming scheme; the network was rebranded as The Family Channel in December 2013).

On July 17, 2012, WMYO began carrying a simulcast of Campbellsville-licensed CW affiliate WBKI-TV (channel 34) in the 720p high definition format (a downconverted signal of WBKI's main channel that broadcast in the 1080i format) on a new third digital subchannel. The simulcast on WMYO (which was remapped as virtual channel 34.1 to correspond with WBKI's PSIP channel) resulted from the formation of a local marketing agreement between Block Communications and new WBKI owner LM Communications, LLC. Sometime in late March 2014, the station relaunched 58.3, which had the PSIP label "COZI TV" and featured only SMPTE color bars. Cozi TV programming began sometime on April 1, 2014. The Family Channel was subsequently removed from 58.2 in late August 2014, with Cozi moving up to the 58.2 slot. A fourth subchannel was put into service on September 1, 2014 as a simulcast of WBKI-DT2, which carries Movies!.

On April 13, 2017, the FCC announced that WBKI had successfully sold their spectrum in the 2016 spectrum auction for $20 million without any outside channel sharing agreement. With Block already having divided up WMYO's channel successfully with WBKI's subchannels, the simulcast was discontinued with WBKI-TV's owner taking the station silent on October 25, 2017, leaving 34.1 and 34.2 exclusive to WMYO and effectively being the last step in a 'merger' between the two stations ongoing since 2012. Under the current WBKI calls, its physical channel was moved to channel 16 on October 18, 2019, as part of the FCC's spectrum re-allocation.

Analog-to-digital conversion
WBKI (as WMYO) discontinued regular programming on its analog signal, over UHF channel 58, on June 12, 2009, the official date in which full-power television stations in the United States transitioned from analog to digital broadcasts under federal mandate. The station's digital signal remained on its pre-transition UHF channel 51. Through the use of PSIP, digital television receivers display the station's virtual channel as its former UHF analog channel 58, which was among the high band UHF channels (52-69) that were removed from broadcasting use as a result of the transition.

ATSC 3.0 lighthouse

Out-of-market coverage
In the Bowling Green, Kentucky media market, the station, as WMYO, was previously carried on the cable systems of the Glasgow Electric Plant Board, in spite of the close proximity of WUXP-TV in Nashville. It was also available on the cable system of the South Central Rural Telephone Cooperative (also based in Glasgow), which serves Barren, Metcalfe, and Hart counties in the Bowling Green market. In January 2015, both cable providers dropped WMYO as Bowling Green's then-new MyNetworkTV outlet WCZU-LD (now a Court TV affiliate), which also had Antenna TV as a primary affiliation outside of MyNetworkTV prime time hours, claimed market exclusivity. WBKO-DT2 also did the same for Fox, and WDRB was also removed. Today, WDNZ-LD has the MyNetworkTV affiliation in Bowling Green.

References

External links

The CW affiliates
MyNetworkTV affiliates
Cozi TV affiliates
Television channels and stations established in 1994
1994 establishments in Indiana
BKI (TV)
ATSC 3.0 television stations